A list of current and retired locomotives in the People's Republic of China.

Steam locomotives
The first steam locomotive in China is thought to be a  gauge 0-4-0T engine used on the Shanghai-Wusong railway. Towards the end of the 19th century concessions obtained from the Qing dynasty enabled foreign powers (Germany, Russia, France and Great Britain) to build railways in China, and they introduced a variety of foreign-built machines. Later Japan gained control over Manchuria as a result of the Treaty of Portsmouth following the Russo-Japanese War and created the South Manchuria Railway from their acquisitions - resulting in Japanese as well as American locomotives being imported into the north-east of China.

After the end of the Second World War China came back under indigenous rule. Locomotive were imported from both the United States and Russia as well as other Communist bloc countries.

Production of steam locomotives continued into the late 20th century. However, steam motive power was supplanted by diesel and electric locomotives as early as the 1950s. The Chinese rail network has been increasingly electrified in the twentieth century.

Standard gauge

Narrow gauge

Diesel locomotives

Diesel-hydraulic transmission
Diesel hydraulic locomotives type descriptions are prefixed either by the roman initials DFH (Diesel fuel, hydraulic) or NY (neiran yeli chuandong 内燃液力传动 also meaning diesel-hydraulic). From the initials of the acronym DFH is derived from their phonetic sound the Chinese name "Dongfang Hong" meaning "Red East", matching the anthem of Communist China: "The East is Red" at the time of their introduction, as well as the well known observation of Chairman Mao Zedong that 'the east is red'. Usually DFH is used for internally produced locomotives and NY for imported or prototype machines.

Chinese made

Imported

Diesel-electric transmission

Chinese made
The Dongfeng (DF) series of diesel electric transmission locomotives is the most important in Chinese rail transport. The Dongfeng4 (DF4) is by far the most common locomotive to be seen on Chinese rails.

Imported

Electric locomotives

AC-DC transmission

Shaoshan (SS) series

Imported

AC-DC-AC transmission
Both post 2000 introductions of asynchronous AC motor driven locomotives and high speed trains based on technology transfer arrangements with other countries have been given the common name "Harmony" series. Ministry of Railways deputy chief engineer Zhang Shuguang explained that the name was to represent energy efficiency and good environmental credentials as well as indicating smooth running of complicated systems. Vehicles of the 'Harmony' series have an "H" in their type descriptions.

References

External links

 
China
Chinese railway-related lists